The northwestern fat mouse (Steatomys caurinus) is a species of rodent in the family Nesomyidae. It is native to tropical West Africa where it occurs on grassland and crop land.

Taxonomy
The northwestern fat mouse was first described as Steatomys caurinus by the British zoologist Oldfield Thomas in 1912. Coatzee considered it, in 1977, to be a subspecies of the fat mouse (Steatomys pratensis), but Swanepoel and Schlitter elevated it to full species rank in 1978.

Description
It is a dark reddish-brown colour and always has ten or more nipples. It is one of three species of fat mouse occurring in West Africa. It can be distinguished from the dainty fat mouse (Steatomys caurinus) by being larger and darker, by having a shorter tail and by having more nipples. The third species, Jackson's fat mouse (Steatomys jacksoni), does not share the same range, being found only in southern Ghana and southern Nigeria.

Distribution and habitat
It is found in Benin, southern Burkina Faso, Ivory Coast, northern Ghana, southwestern Mali, Niger, northern Nigeria, Senegal, and Togo, where its natural habitat is subtropical or tropical dry shrubland and agricultural land.

Status
The northwestern fat mouse is a somewhat uncommon species showing considerable population swings. It has a wide range and a presumed large total population, and is present in several protected areas, so the International Union for Conservation of Nature has assessed its conservation status as "least concern".

References

Musser, G. G. and M. D. Carleton. 2005. Superfamily Muroidea. pp. 894–1531 in Mammal Species of the World a Taxonomic and Geographic Reference. D. E. Wilson and D. M. Reeder eds. Johns Hopkins University Press, Baltimore.

Steatomys
Mammals described in 1912
Taxa named by Oldfield Thomas
Taxonomy articles created by Polbot